Paraplesiops is a genus containing five largely allopatric species of fishes in the longfin, or roundhead, family Plesiopidae, commonly known as blue devils, bluedevils, or blue devilfish because of their colouration.  The genus is most similar to the tropical genera Plesiops and Fraudella.  It is restricted to subtropical and temperate rocky and coral reefs in Australian waters.  Its species are mostly cryptic, occurring in submarine caves, crevices and under rocky ledges.

Species 
 Paraplesiops alisonae Hoese and Kuiter, 1984 – Alison's blue devil
 Paraplesiops bleekeri (Günther, 1861) – eastern blue devil
 Paraplesiops meleagris (Peters, 1869) –southern blue devil
 Paraplesiops poweri Ogilby, 1908 – northern blue devil
 Paraplesiops sinclairi Hutchins, 1987 – western blue devil

References 

 
Plesiopinae
Marine fish genera
 
Taxa named by Pieter Bleeker